The Dublin Review of Books (drb) is an Irish review of literature, history, the arts, and culture.

The magazine publishes long-form essays exploring themes related to newly published books; shorter, more conventional book reviews; blog entries on a wider variety of topics; and short extracts from books that highlight their broader arguments.

History 

Established in 2006, the drb launched its first full issue as an online quarterly review in Spring 2007. Founded and jointly edited by Enda O'Doherty, an Irish Times journalist, and Maurice Earls, the proprietor of Books Upstairs bookshop in Dublin, it is consciously modelled on its near-namesakes, the New York Review of Books and the London Review of Books. The magazine aims to provide writers with a forum to develop their arguments and share knowledge in longer review-essays than those found in conventional newspapers and magazines. Along with The Dublin Review, The Honest Ulsterman, The Stinging Fly, Poetry Ireland Review and various other titles, it is one of a number of periodicals to have contributed to a boom in Irish literary journals over the past decade.

Since Autumn 2012, the drb has been published fortnightly online, with additional material published between each issue in the form of shorter blog posts.

Contributors 

Since the magazine's inception, many notable writers, poets, academics, diplomats, and politicians from Ireland and further afield have contributed to it. Previous contributors have included:

John Banville, novelist
Paul Bew, historian and life peer
Angela Bourke, historian and novelist
John Bruton, former Taoiseach of Ireland and EU Ambassador to the United States
Mary E. Daly, economic historian
Seamus Deane, poet, novelist, critic, and intellectual historian
Terry Eagleton, British critic and literary theorist
Marianne Elliott, historian
Ronan Fanning, historian and commentator
Joschka Fischer, former Foreign Minister and Vice Chancellor of Germany
Roy Foster, historian
Tom Garvin, political scientist and historian
Nicola Gordon Bowe, British art historian 
David Goodall, British diplomat and former High Commissioner to India
Adrian Hardiman, member of the Supreme Court of Ireland
Eckhard Jesse, German political scientist
Ryszard Kapuściński, Polish journalist, photographer, poet, and author
Philip MacCann, British author
Lara Marlowe, American journalist
Frank McGuinness, writer
Eiléan Ní Chuilleanáin, poet
Conor O'Clery, journalist and writer
Joseph O'Connor, novelist
Cormac Ó Gráda, economic historian
Eunan O'Halpin, historian
Brendan O'Leary, political scientist
Kevin O'Rourke, Chichele Professor of Economic History at Oxford University and Fellow of All Souls College, Oxford
Siobhán Parkinson, writer
Pat Rabbitte, former Labour Party politician and minister
Ivor Roberts, former British diplomat

References

Further reading

External links 
 Official website

Biweekly magazines
Book review magazines
English-language magazines
Literary magazines published in Ireland
Political magazines published in Ireland
Magazines established in 2007
Mass media in Dublin (city)
2007 establishments in Ireland